Teviot Brook is a waterway in South East Queensland, Australia.  It rises in the Main Range at Carneys Creek and joins the Logan River at Cedar Grove.  It is part of the Clarence Moreton Basin, a sedimentary basin on the easternmost part of the Australian continent.

The catchment experiences strong seasonality with heavy rainfall in summer and a dry winter.  Teviot Brook passes through the town of Boonah and Mount Alford. Close to its mouth, Teviot Brook is crossed by the Sydney–Brisbane rail corridor.

History
It was named on 6 August 1828 by Allan Cunningham, a botanist and explorer, after the River Teviot, Roxburghshire, Scotland.  A plaque commemorating the naming is found at Coulson School in Coulson.   

In 2011, the Wyaralong Dam was opened.  It dams the Teviot Brook between Allenview and Wyaralong at the southern end of the Flinders Peak Group.

Management
The state government is working with landholders in the catchment to reduce sediment and nutrient runoff.  Other restoration programs along the river aim to control weeds, restore native vegetation and stabilise eroding banks.

References

Scenic Rim Region
Rivers of Queensland
Logan City